St. Anne's Church is a church in the historic center of Warsaw, Poland, adjacent to the Castle Square, at Krakowskie Przedmieście 68. It is one of Poland's most notable churches with a Neoclassical facade. The church ranks among Warsaw's oldest buildings. Over time, it has seen many reconstructions, resulting in its present-day appearance, unchanged since 1788. Currently it is the main church parish of the academic community in Warsaw.

History 
In 1454 Duchess of Masovia Anna Fiodorowna (in some old books mistakenly called Holszanska), coming from a Ruthenized Lithuanian princely house, founded this church with a cloister for the Franciscan friars (Order of Friars Minor).

The square in front of the church was a place of solemn homages to Polish monarchs by the rulers of Prussia (the first one in 1578, the last one in 1621). In 1582 a slender tower was added to the church. Some time later it was encompassed with a rampart and incorporated into the city fortifications.

The St. Anne's Church was reconstructed several times in 1603, 1634, 1636 and in 1667 (it was heavily damaged during the siege of Warsaw and plundered by Swedish and German troops in the 1650s). Between 1740 and 1760 the façade was reconstructed in rococo style according to Jakub Fontana's design and decorated with two filigree belfries. The walls and semicircular vault ceilings of the church, divided into bays, were decorated at that time with profuse paintings in perspective, using illusionary techniques and depicting scenes in the life of Saint Anne. A chapel of Saint Ładysław was also decorated in this fashion. All paintings were by Friar Walenty Żebrowski.
 
The church was reconstructed for the last time between 1786 and 1788 by order of King Stanisław August Poniatowski.

During the Warsaw Uprising of 1794, part of the national Kościuszko Uprising in 1794, Bishop Józef Kossakowski, considered the traitor of the nation, was executed in front of the church (hanged with a great applause by Warsaw inhabitants).

The roof of the church was heavily damaged in the air raid on Warsaw in 1939 and then destroyed by fire in 1944 during the Warsaw Uprising but soon repaired. In 1949 the walls were undermined by the excavation for the WZ route and had to be quickly reinforced. Restoration of all elements was undertaken from the 1940s-70s, supervised by architect .

Façade and interior
The present façade was built in 1788 in a Neoclassical style typical of the reign of King Stanisław August Poniatowski, by Chrystian Piotr Aigner. Sculptors of that time were Jakub Monaldi and Franciszek Pinck, who carved statues of the Four Evangelists which decorate the façade. The interior of the church is now in high-baroque style with several chapels. The church makes an overwhelming impression on the visitor with its surprisingly rich interior filled with frescoes.

The only example of a diamond vault preserved in Warsaw can be seen in the cloister leading to the vestry.

See also 
 Castle Square 
 Krakowskie Przedmieście
 Presidential Palace
 St. Florian's Cathedral

Notes 

In-line:

Gallery

Historical images

Interior

Exterior

External links 

 St. Anna's Church
  www.warszawa1939.pl 
  St. Anne's Church in 1795

Roman Catholic churches completed in 1788
18th-century Roman Catholic church buildings in Poland
Roman Catholic churches in Warsaw
Neoclassical architecture in Warsaw
1788 establishments in the Polish–Lithuanian Commonwealth
Neoclassical church buildings in Poland